Sustainable South Bronx (SSBx) is a non-profit  organization which promotes environmental justice.  SSBx was founded by Majora Carter in 2001. Today, it is a division of the HOPE Program.

See also

 New York Foundation
 Honor Award from the National Building Museum

References

External links 
 SustainableSouthBronx.org

Community organizations
Urban forestry organizations
Environmental organizations based in New York City
Environmental justice in New York City
Non-profit organizations based in the Bronx